Nepal–Serbia relations refers to bilateral foreign relations between Nepal and Serbia.

Nepal–Serbia relations were officially established on 7 October 1959. Both Nepal and Serbia do not have an embassy in each other's countries. They both have a concurrently non-resident embassy. Nepal does not recognise Kosovo, a partially recognised state in Southeast Europe.

References 

 
Serbia
Nepal